Ihringen is a town in the district of Breisgau-Hochschwarzwald in Baden-Württemberg in Germany, just east of Breisach am Rhein and west of Freiburg im Breisgau at the southern end of the Kaiserstuhl. It is known for its wine.

Climate
By most sources, it is the warmest place in Germany. 

Under the Köppen system, Ihringen closely borders an incredibly rare 48°N humid subtropical climate (Cfa), with mildly cold winters and long, hot summers.
The city is close to the Kaiserstuhl, a range of hills of volcanic origin located a few miles away which is considered to be one of the warmest places of Germany and therefore one of the most important viticultural area.

Climate types

References

Breisgau-Hochschwarzwald
Baden